Sacoila is a genus of flowering plants from the orchid family, Orchidaceae, native to the Western Hemisphere. It occurs in Mexico, Central America, South America, the West Indies and Florida.

Species
Species accepted as of June 2014:

Sacoila argentina (Griseb.) Garay - Bolivia, Paraguay, Argentina
Sacoila duseniana (Kraenzl.) Garay - Brazil 
Sacoila foliosa (Schltr.) Garay - Brazil 
Sacoila hassleri (Cogn.) Garay - Suriname, Paraguay, Brazil 
Sacoila lanceolata (Aubl.) Garay - widespread from Florida and Mexico south to Argentina
Sacoila pedicellata (Cogn.) Garay - Brazil, Paraguay, Argentina
Sacoila squamulosa (Kunth) Garay - Colombia, Costa Rica, Cuba, Jamaica, Leeward Islands, Cayman Islands, Florida

See also 
 List of Orchidaceae genera

References 

 Pridgeon, A.M., Cribb, P.J., Chase, M.A. & Rasmussen, F. eds. (1999). Genera Orchidacearum 1. Oxford Univ. Press.
 Pridgeon, A.M., Cribb, P.J., Chase, M.A. & Rasmussen, F. eds. (2001). Genera Orchidacearum 2. Oxford Univ. Press.
 Pridgeon, A.M., Cribb, P.J., Chase, M.A. & Rasmussen, F. eds. (2003). Genera Orchidacearum 3. Oxford Univ. Press
 Berg Pana, H. 2005. Handbuch der Orchideen-Namen. Dictionary of Orchid Names. Dizionario dei nomi delle orchidee. Ulmer, Stuttgart

Cranichideae genera
Spiranthinae